"You Are My King (Amazing Love)" is a worship song written by Billy James Foote. It was originally released on contemporary Christian released by Phillips, Craig & Dean on their 2001 album Let My Words Be Few, and then by contemporary Christian group Newsboys from their 2003 album Adoration: The Worship Album, also appearing in later compilations He Reigns: The Worship Collection, The Greatest Hits, and The Ultimate Collection and on the various hits compilation WOW Hits 2005. The chorus uses lyrics and melody from  Charles Wesley's hymn, "And Can It Be".

Charts
Weekly

Decade-end

References

2003 singles
2003 songs
Sparrow Records singles